is a Japanese footballer who plays as a central midfielder for FC Gifu.

Club career
He played for Sanfrecce Hiroshima and Urawa Red Diamonds before moving to Gifu. He won the 2017 AFC Champions League with the Reds.

National team career
In July 2007, Kashiwagi played for the Japan U-20 national team in the 2007 U-20 World Cup. At this tournament, he wore the number 10 shirt and played all 4 matches as the starting offensive midfielder.

In January 2010, Kashiwagi was called up to the Japanese national team for the 2011 Asian Cup qualifiers. He debuted against Yemen on the 6th of January 2011.

Club statistics

1Includes J. League promotion/relegation Series, J. League Championship and Japanese Super Cup.

National team statistics

Honours
Sanfrecce Hiroshima
J.League Division 2: 2008

Urawa Red Diamonds
J. League Cup: 2016
Emperor's Cup: 2018
AFC Champions League: 2017

Japan
AFC Asian Cup: 2011

Individual
J.League Best XI: 2016
AFC Champions League Best Player: 2017

Personal life
In March 2016, he announced that he had married Nagisa Sato, a TBS announcer.

References

External links
 
 
 
 Profile at Urawa Red Diamonds 
 Yosuke Kashiwagi at Yahoo! Japan sports 

1987 births
Living people
Association football midfielders
Association football people from Hyōgo Prefecture
Japanese footballers
Japan youth international footballers
Japan international footballers
J1 League players
J2 League players
J3 League players
Sanfrecce Hiroshima players
Urawa Red Diamonds players
FC Gifu players
2011 AFC Asian Cup players
AFC Asian Cup-winning players